The 1991 European Wrestling Championships were held in the men's Freestyle style in Stuttgart 3 – 6 May 1991; the Greco-Romane style in Aschaffenburg 26 – 29 April 1991.

Medal table

Medal summary

Men's freestyle

Men's Greco-Roman

References

External links
Fila's official championship website

Europe
W
European Wrestling Championships
Euro
Sports competitions in Stuttgart
1991 in European sport